Final Four of the Adriatic League to be played from 23–24 March 2019 in the Celje, Slovenia.

Semifinals

For third place

Final

Bracket

Notes
 All times given below are in Central European Time.

References

External links
Official website

Final Four